The Ven John Fisher (30 May 1788 – 25 August 1832) was Archdeacon of Berkshire from 1817 to 1832.
Born at Brentford on 30 May 1788, he was educated at Charterhouse and Christ's College, Cambridge and ordained in 1812. His first post was as Domestic Chaplain to his uncle, the Bishop of Salisbury. He held incumbencies at Idmiston, Osmington, Winfrith Newburgh and Gillingham, Dorset. He was appointed a Canon of Salisbury Cathedral in 1819. His son Osmond Fisher was a noted geologist.

He died at Boulogne on 25 August 1832.

References

1788 births
People educated at Charterhouse School
Alumni of Christ's College, Cambridge
People from Brentford
Archdeacons of Berkshire
1832 deaths